The Oil Taxation Act 1975 (c 22) is a UK Act of Parliament relevant for UK enterprise law that was intended to ensure that oil and gas extraction companies operating in British territories and waters paid their fair share of tax. Over many years of amendments it was largely eliminated over 2015 and 2016, as the Petroleum Revenue Tax was cut to zero.

Contents
s 1, previously 50% now 0% Petroleum Revenue Tax.
s 13, ring fence corporation tax, if ‘any oil extraction activities’ are undertaken or any ‘acquisition, enjoyment or exploitation of oil rights’ done, they are to be treated as a ‘separate trade, distinct from other activities’ carried out by the company.
s 19, downstream activities (e.g. refining) or those outside the UK are not in the scope of the ring fence.

Oil Taxation Act 1975 
The Oil Taxation Act 1975 (1975 c. 22) received Royal Assent on 8 May 1975. Its long title is ‘An Act to impose a new tax in respect of profits from substances won or capable of being won under the authority of licences granted under the Petroleum (Production) Act 1934 or the Petroleum (Production) Act (Northern Ireland) 1964; to make in the law relating to income tax and corporation tax amendments connected with such substances or with petroleum companies; and for connected purposes’.

Provisions 
The Act comprises 21 Sections in 3 Parts and 9 Schedules

 PART I Petroleum Revenue Tax
 Section 1 Petroleum revenue tax
 Section 2 Assessable profits and allowable losses
 Section 3 Allowance of expenditure (other than expenditure on long-term assets and abortive exploration expenditure)
 Section 4 Allowance of expenditure on long-term assets
 Section 5 Allowance of abortive exploration expenditure
 Section 6 Allowance of unrelievable loss from abandoned field
 Section 7 Relief for allowable losses
 Section 8 Oil allowance
 Section 9 Annual limit on amount of tax payable by participator
 Section 10 Modification of Part I in connection with certain gas sold to British Gas Corporation
 Section 11 Application of Provisional Collection of Taxes Act 1968
 Section 12 Interpretation of Part I
 PART II Provisions Relating to the Extraction of Petroleum in the United Kingdom or a Designated Area
 Section 13 Treatment of oil extraction activities etc. for purposes of income tax and corporation tax
 Section 14 Valuation of oil disposed of or appropriated in certain circumstances
 Section 15 Oil extraction activities etc.: charges on income
 Section 16 Oil extraction activities etc.: restriction on setting advance corporation tax against income therefrom
 Section 17 Corporation tax: deduction of petroleum revenue tax in computing income
 Section 18 Interest on tax overpaid to be disregarded in computing income
 Section 19 Interpretation of Part II
 PART III Miscellaneous and General
 Section 20 Modification of certain provisions in relation to petroleum companies
 Section 21 Citation, interpretation and construction
 SCHEDULES
 SCHEDULE 1 Determination of Oil Fields
 SCHEDULE 2 Management and Collection of Petroleum Revenue Tax
 SCHEDULE 3 Petroleum Revenue tax : Miscellaneous Provisions
 SCHEDULE 4 Provisions Supplementary to Sections 3 and 4
 SCHEDULE 5 Allowance of Expenditure (other than Abortive Exploration Expenditure)
 SCHEDULE 6 Allowance of Expenditure (other than Abortive Exploration Expenditure) on Claim by Participator
 SCHEDULE 7 Allowance of Abortive Exploration Expenditure
 SCHEDULE 8 Allowance of Unrelievable Field Loss
 SCHEDULE 9 Extension of Section 485 of Taxes Act in Relation to Petroleum Companies

Other legislation 
Subsequent legislation that has amended the 1975 Act includes:

 Petroleum Revenue Tax Act 1980 (1980 c. 1)
 Oil Taxation Act 1983 (1983 c. 56)
 Petroleum Royalties (Relief) Act 1983 (1983 c. 59)
 Advance Petroleum Revenue Tax Act 1986 (1986  c. 68)
 Petroleum Royalties (Relief) and Continental Shelf Act 1989 (1989 c. 1)

See also
Petroleum Revenue Tax
UK enterprise law
UK energy law
Corporation Tax Act 2010 ss 272-279A on remaining oil and gas taxes

References

United Kingdom enterprise law
United Kingdom Acts of Parliament 1975